There are two municipalities named Webster in Wisconsin:

Webster, Burnett County, Wisconsin, a village
Webster, Vernon County, Wisconsin, a town

vo:Webster (Wisconsin)